The Blominmäki sewage treatment plant is being built in Espoo, Finland, with a target completion date of 2021. It represents the most expensive investment of the Helsinki Region Environmental Services Authority ever, with a total cost that could be as high as 392 million Euros. It is the second most expensive infrastructure project in the Helsinki Metropolitan Area, behind the coming extension of the Western Metro.

The plant will clean sewage from some 400,000 local residents from Espoo, Kauniainen, Vihti, Siuntio and western Vantaa. In the future, its operations could be enlarged, so that it could process the sewage of a million residents.

The sewage to be cleaned will first flow to the Suomenoja sewage treatment plant, and from there it is pumped through pipelines for eight kilometers to the northwest of the Ring III highway, to Blominmäki, for the cleaning process. After the sewage is cleaned, it flows on its own weight back to Suomenoja, and from there it will be pumped to the Gulf of Finland where it will flow into the sea at a distance of 15 kilometres from the shore. The sewage thus moves back and forth in Espoo, and the reason for this is that it would be too expensive to rebuild all the pipeline systems in Espoo. It was not possible to plan the plant closer to Suomenoja due to a great resistance of local residents in the area.

The technology used in the plant is much the same as in other such plants in Finland, and the performance of this technology is well known. Some new technology will be used at the end of the process, and this includes the filtering of phosphorus with special discs. It is claimed that 96% of the phosphorus can be cleaned this way. 90% of the nitrogen will also be cleaned by the plant. The plant also produces sludge and biogas, and the plant will be heated with the help of the latter. It is also possible that the plant will be self-sufficient with regard to electricity.

The sludge will decompose in 35° Celsius. There will be four tubs for the anaerobic digestion process, and they have been mined into the bedrock. The tubs are 25 metres high and their volume is 6,000 cubic metres. A propeller stirs the sludge to enable a smooth process. The sludge will be ready in 3–4 weeks, after which it will be transported to the Ämmässuo Waste Treatment Plant, where it will be allowed to compost. The output will be 250,000 tons of dried sludge per year. The liquids from the sludge will be processed in Blominmäki. In order to minimize the smell nuisance, the pipe of the plant will be 100 metres tall.

References

Buildings and structures in Espoo
Waste management
Water supply